The 2002 California Golden Bears football team was an American football team that represented the University of California, Berkeley in the Pacific-10 Conference (Pac-10) during the 2002 NCAA Division I-A football season. In their first year under head coach Jeff Tedford, the Golden Bears compiled a 7–5 record (4–4 against Pac-10 opponents), finished in a tie for fourth place in the Pac-10, and outscored their opponents by a combined score of 427 to 318.

The team's statistical leaders included Kyle Boller with 2,815 passing yards, Joe Igber with 1,130 rushing yards, and Lashaun Ward with 709 receiving yards. Despite finishing the season with a 7–5 record, the Bears did not participate in a bowl game due to NCAA sanctions.

Schedule

Game summaries

Baylor

Roster

References

California
California Golden Bears football seasons
California Golden Bears football